Chris Okagbue  (born Okechukwu Christopher Ofala Okechukwu Okagbue, 23 June 1987) is a Nigerian model, actor, movie producer , and reality television star. He was the winner of the Gulder Ultimate Search season 8 reality show. He is of the Igbo tribe and is the son of the former Obi of Onitsha.

Background and education
Okagbue is from Onitsha in Anambra state. He is a twin. He was born into the royal family of the former Obi of Onitsha, the late H.R.H. Obi Ofala Okechukwu Okagbue and Ogechukwu Clara Okagbue, on 23 June 1987. His parents have six children, namely his elder sister Sandra Okagbue who is a former model and beauty queen, his twin brother Christian, and three younger sisters, Jane, Christabel and Bella. He has a degree in sociology from the University of Lagos.

Career
His first venture into show business was as a model in 2004, when he appeared in commercials for brands like Cadbury Plc, MTN, Nigerian Breweries, Coca-Cola and Airtel at age 17. He moved into acting in 2007 when he was given a part after accompanying friends to an audition and decided to give it a try. He then appeared as Preye Pepple in the TV series The Station. The series was directed by Achor Yusuf who also gave him his second acting role as Lucky Edeghor in the TV series The Maze. Okagbue took a break from acting for a while until he found a job he had taken a liking to, TV presenting. He had a short spell with Koga Studios and at the time had covered the live red carpet of notable events such as the launch of Wizkid's first album, Superstar, Yemi Sax's Sax Appeal concert and DJ Jimmy Jatt's Jimmy's Jumpoff concert. He returned to acting shortly after as Victor in the TV series Secrets and Scandals. His break came when he was given the role of Emil Haruna in the M-NET TV series Tinsel.

He made his first appearance in a cinema film with a small role in the movie A Wish, followed by the movie Playing Safe, both directed by Elvis Chuks.
His biggest role is as the lead character in the critically acclaimed movie Lotanna. He played the role of Lotanna in the film which starred the Ghanaian actress Ama K. Abebrese, Jide Kosoko, Bimbo Manuel, Victor Olaotan and Liz Benson. He made his debut on stage acting in a comedy play titled Election Fever which depicted the Nigerian government and its electoral system. The play was directed by Bolanle Austen-Peters and was sponsored by The Ford Foundation, British Council and the Lagos Theatre Festival.

Okagbue has starred in movies with Joke Silva, Fella Makafui, Tonto Dike, Ini Edo, Ama K. Abebrese, Jide Kosoko, Martha Ankomah, Bimbo Manuel, Ngozi Ezeonu, Victor Olaotan and Liz Benson amongst others, and has worked extensively with directors like Obi Emelonye, Elvis Chuks, Toka Mcbaror, Victor Sanchez Aghahowa, Achor Yusuf, James Omokwe and Moses Inwang.

In 2012, Okagbue was made a brand ambassador for Passion Energy Drink, by Orange Drugs Limited. He appeared in both TV and print commercials for the brand. In 2018, Okagbue was announced as on official Festival Ambassador by the Nollywood Travel Film Festival for the 2018 edition of the festival

Gulder Ultimate Search 8 winner
Okagbue won season 8 of the reality show Gulder Ultimate Search in 2011. The show was held in the Kukuruku Hills in Egbetua quarters, Akoko-Edo of Edo State and was themed "The Contest of Champions". The task was to find the second lost helmet of General Maximilian Of the initial 30 contenders, ten champions were picked to appear on the show. Okagbue emerged as the winner. His prizes as winner included seven million Nigerian naira, an SUV and a ₦500,000 wardrobe allowance for one year.

As a result of being voted one of top three past winners of the show, he returned to the Gulder Ultimate Search season 9 themed "Gatekeepers' Fortune"  where he was charged with the special role of Gatekeeper.

Personal life
Okagbue has an unreserved love for the city of Paris and French people in general. He explained in an interview with The Punch newspaper about his experience during a family vacation to France that he believes Paris is called the "City of Love" because the French people are friendly and romantic. He is not currently married.

Filmography

FIlm

Television

Awards and nominations

As a model
His awards and nominations list for modeling and fashion includes:
The 9ja Top Models Awards 2008
Nigerian Models Achievers Awards: Model Of The Year 2009
Peak Awards Model Of The Year 2010
Peak Awards Model Of The Year 2012
Nigerian Models Achievers Awards: Fast-Rising Model Actor 2014
Lagos Fashion Awards 2015: Special Recognition For Most Fashionable TV Personality Of The Year
Nigerian Icon Fashion Awards: Personality Fashion Icon Of The Year 2015
Green October Event Awards: Most Fashionable Male Celebrity 2017

As an actor
Links Achievers Awards: Fast-Rising Actor 2015
Golden Movie Awards: Golden Actor (Drama) 2017 - nominated
City People Movie Awards: Most Promising Actor of the Year (English) 2017 - nominated
Nigeria Achievers Awards: Next Rated Actor Of The Year 2017 - nominated
Zulu African Film Academy Awards: Best Newcomer for the film Lotanna 2018

Others
MoreKlue All Youth Awards Africa For Style: Influencer Of The Year 2018
African Entertainment Legend Awards: Special Recognition Awards For Achievements In Entertainment
Nigerian Designers Awards: Social Media Brand Influencer 2018

See also
 List of Nigerian actors
 List of Nigerian film producers

References

External links

1987 births
Living people
Male actors from Anambra State
Participants in Nigerian reality television series
Nigerian male television actors
Nigerian male film actors
Igbo actors
Nigerian television personalities
Nigerian film producers
University of Lagos alumni
Nigerian male models